HAMMER2 is a successor to the HAMMER filesystem, redesigned from the ground up to support enhanced clustering. HAMMER2 supports online and batched deduplication, snapshots, directory entry indexing, multiple mountable filesystem roots, mountable snapshots, a low memory footprint, compression, encryption, zero-detection, data and metadata checksumming, and synchronization to other filesystems or nodes. It lacks support for extended file attributes (xattr).

History 

The HAMMER2 file system was conceived by Matthew Dillon, who initially planned to bring it up to minimal working state by July 2012 and ship the final version in 2013. During Google Summer of Code 2013 Daniel Flores implemented compression in HAMMER2 using LZ4 and zlib algorithms. On June 4, 2014, DragonFly 3.8.0 was released featuring support for HAMMER2, although the file system was said to be not ready for use.  On October 16, 2017, DragonFly 5.0 was released with bootable support for HAMMER2, though file-system status was marked as experimental. 

HAMMER2 had a long incubation and development period before it officially entered production in April 2018, as the recommended root filesystem in the Dragonfly BSD 5.2 release.

Dillon continues to actively develop and maintain HAMMER2 as of June 2020.

See also 

 Comparison of file systems
 List of file systems
 ZFS
 Btrfs
 OpenZFS

References

External links 
 

DragonFly BSD
Distributed file systems
2014 software